The following railroads operate in the U.S. state of Delaware.

Common freight carriers
Conrail Shared Assets Operations
CSX Transportation (CSXT)
Delmarva Central Railroad (DCR)
East Penn Railroad (ESPN)
Maryland and Delaware Railroad (MDDE)
Norfolk Southern Railway (NS)
Wilmington and Western Railroad (WWRC)
Lehigh Eastern RailRoad (LHEN)

Passenger carriers
Amtrak (AMTK)
SEPTA: Wilmington/Newark Line
Wilmington and Western Railroad (WWRC)
Delaware Valley RailRoad (DVRR)

Defunct railroads

See also
List of railroad lines in the Delmarva Peninsula

Notes

References

 
 
Delaware
Railroad